The 1997 Regal Welsh Open was a professional ranking snooker tournament that took place between 24 January–1 February 1997 at the Newport Leisure Centre in Newport, Wales.

Mark Williams was the defending champion, but lost in the semi-final to Mark King.

Stephen Hendry defeated Mark King 9–2 in the final to win his second Welsh Open title.


Main draw

Final

References

Welsh Open (snooker)
1997 in snooker
1990s in Cardiff
Welsh